Lawrence "Laurie"/"Gilly" M. Gilfedder (15 May 1935 – 7 January 2019 ) was an English rugby union and professional rugby league footballer who played in the 1950s and 1960s.

Background
Gilfedder's birth was registered in Warrington, Lancashire, he was raised in Woolston and moved to Stockton Heath after his marriage in 1955, he was a senior warehouse supervisor for Greenall's Brewery from 1960-91, he died, aged 83, on 7 January 2019 in Warrington Hospital, Warrington.

Playing career

International honours
Laurie Gilfedder won caps for Great Britain while at Warrington on the 1962 Great Britain Lions tour against Australia, New Zealand (2 matches), and France, and in 1963 against France.

Only five players have played test matches for Great Britain as both a back, and a forward, they are Gilfedder, Colin Dixon, Frank Gallagher, Billy Jarman and Harry Street.

Challenge Cup Final appearances
Laurie Gilfedder played , and scored a try, and 3-goals, including a penalty from the halfway line after one-minute ten-seconds, in Wigan's 20–16 victory over Hunslet in the 1965 Challenge Cup Final during the 1964–65 season at Wembley Stadium, London on Saturday 8 May 1965, in front of a crowd of 89,016, and played, and scored a goal in the 2–21 defeat by St. Helens in the 1966 Challenge Cup Final during the 1965–66 season at Wembley Stadium, London on Saturday 21 May 1966, in front of a crowd of 98,536.

County Cup Final appearances
Laurie Gilfedder played right-, i.e. number 12, scored a try, and 2-goals in Wigan's 16–13 victory over Oldham in the 1966 Lancashire County Cup Final during the 1966–67 season at Station Road, Swinton, on Saturday 29 October 1966.

BBC2 Floodlit Trophy Final appearances
Laurie Gilfedder played , and scored a goal in Leigh's 5–8 defeat by Castleford in the 1967 BBC2 Floodlit Trophy Final during the 1967–68 season at Headingley Rugby Stadium, Leeds on Saturday 16 January 1968.

Club career
Laurie Gilfedder made his début for Warrington aged 16 years and 199 days against the Belle Vue Rangers on Saturday 1 December 1951, during his time at Warrington they won the 1953–54 and 1954–55 Championship, the 1953–54 Challenge Cup (in which he did not play), the 1953–54, 1954–55 and 1955–56 Lancashire County League, and the 1959–60 Lancashire County Cup, with 22-tries he was Warrington's leading try-scorer during the 1956–57 season (the only season from 1947 to 1961 that it wasn’t Brian Bevan), he played his last match for Warrington and scored 5-goals in the 13-15 defeat by Hull Kingston Rovers at Old Craven Park, Kingston upon Hull on Saturday 1 June 1963, he was transferred to Wigan during August 1963 for a club record fee of £9,500 (based on increases in average earnings, this would be approximately £382,500 in 2017). 

He made his début for Wigan in the 10-3 victory over Widnes at Central Park, Wigan on Saturday 24 August 1963, he scored his first try for Wigan in the 22-6 victory over Leeds at Central Park, Wigan on Wednesday 4 September 1963, following the rule change to allow of substitutions, along with Chris Hesketh he jointly became Wigan's first interchange/substitute in the 3-10 defeat by Widnes at Naughton Park, Widnes on Saturday 14 November 1964, he scored his last try for Wigan in the 40-0 victory over Whitehaven at Central Park, Wigan on Saturday 12 November 1966, he played his last match for Wigan Match in the 12-15 defeat by Swinton at Central Park, Wigan on Saturday 2 September 1967, he made his début for Leigh during the 1967–68 season, and he played his last match for Leigh during the 1968–69 season.

Honoured at Warrington Wolves
Laurie Gilfedder is a Warrington Hall of Fame inductee.

Genealogical information
Laurie Gilfedder's marriage to Hilda (née Berry) was registered during first ¼  1955 in Newton district. They had children; Dianne M. Gilfedder (birth registered during third ¼  in Warrington district), and Lynne M. Gilfedder (birth registered during second ¼  in Warrington district).

References

External links
!Great Britain Statistics at englandrl.co.uk (statistics currently missing due to not having appeared for both Great Britain, and England)

 

1935 births
2019 deaths
English Roman Catholics
English rugby league players
English rugby union players
Great Britain national rugby league team players
Lancashire rugby league team players
Leigh Leopards players
Rugby league centres
Rugby league locks
Rugby league players from Warrington
Rugby league second-rows
Rugby league utility players
Rugby union players from Warrington
Warrington Wolves players
Wigan Warriors players